Leucania multilinea, the many-lined wainscot, is a species of cutworm or dart moth in the family Noctuidae.  It is found in North America.

The MONA or Hodges number for Leucania multilinea is 10446.

References

Further reading

 
 
 

Leucania
Moths described in 1856